The 2020–21 Northern Michigan Wildcats men's ice hockey season was the 45th season of play for the program and the 21st in the WCHA conference. The Wildcats represented Northern Michigan University and were coached by Grant Potulny, in his 4th season.

Season
As a result of the ongoing COVID-19 pandemic the entire college ice hockey season was delayed. Because the NCAA had previously announced that all winter sports athletes would retain whatever eligibility they possessed through at least the following year, none of Northern Michigan's players would lose a season of play. However, the NCAA also approved a change in its transfer regulations that would allow players to transfer and play immediately rather than having to sit out a season, as the rules previously required.

Northern Michigan began the season poorly. In their first 14 games the team's only wins were against Ferris State, the worst team in the nation. Their 4–10 record included an 8-game losing streak and made it all but impossible for the Wildcats to make the NCAA Tournament without winning their conference championship. The team went through a great deal of changes, including Grant Loven transferring to St. Thomas mid-season and bringing in Rico DiMatteo after the new year. It was more than a month before DiMatteo made his first appearance for NMU but, once he did, the Wildcats' season completely turned around. DiMatteo helped Northern Michigan get the first win of the year that wasn't against FSU and then sweep a ranked Bemidji State team the very next weekend.

The team sagged at the end of the regular season, finishing 6th in the conference, and entered the WCHA Tournament with little hope of advancing. NMU gave #13 Bowling Green a surprise in the first game, winning 4–3, but when the Falcons roared back for a 5–0 victory in game two the series looked ready to be over. DiMatteo was shelled in the third game, facing a total of 40 shots in regulation, but he only allowed one by him while the Wildcat offense pumped 5 goals into the net and the team earned a surprising trip to the semifinals. The Wildcats were set against #3 Minnesota State and again pulled off a miraculous upset. The Wildcats fired 4 goals past the top goaltender in the nation and scored 5 in all before the Mavericks could even respond. The next day NMU was looking for the first championship in 29 years and only had Lake Superior State standing in their way. In the first ever postseason meeting between the two upper peninsula teams, Northern Michigan's magic ran out and they surrendered two goals in each period, losing the title game 3–6.

James Miller and John Roberts sat out the season.

Departures

Recruiting

Roster
As of March 1, 2021.

† Grant Loven played 6 games before transferring to St. Thomas.

Standings

Schedule and Results

|-
!colspan=12 style=";" | Regular Season

|-
!colspan=12 style=";" | 

|- align="center" bgcolor="#e0e0e0"
|colspan=12|Northern Michigan Won Series 2–1

Scoring statistics

Goaltending statistics

Rankings

USCHO did not release a poll in week 20.

Awards and honors

References

Northern Michigan Wildcats men's ice hockey seasons
Northern Michigan Wildcats
Northern Michigan Wildcats
Northern Michigan Wildcats
Northern Michigan Wildcats
Northern Michigan Wildcats